Project Worldwide, sometimes simplified as Project, is a privately held Auburn Hills, Michigan-based advertising holding company.  Founded in 2010, the company owns 13 agencies, including George P. Johnson and Partners & Napier, through an employee stock ownership structure.

Robert G. Valley Jr. is the company's Chairman and CEO.

History

Project Worldwide was founded in 2010 by Robert G. Vallee, Jr., then Chairman and CEO of George P. Johnson, an event and brand marketing firm based in Auburn Hills, Michigan. George P. Johnson, which traces its history back to 1914, managed several agencies it had previously acquired, including California-based agency Juxt, Australian agency Spinifex Group and Germany's Raumtechnik. The company's executives formed Project Worldwide as a holding company, to include George P. Johnson, and the company was structured so that its employees would own 100% of the company through an employee stock-ownership plan (ESOP).

In 2011, the company acquired Rochester, NY-based agency Partners & Napier. 

In November 2012, the company acquired Denver, Colorado-based full service agency Motive.

In March 2013, Project funded the launch of Argonaut, an advertising agency based in San Francisco, which became one of Project's agencies. In May, the company launched shopper marketing firm Shoptology.

In August 2016, Project acquired Brooklyn-based public relations agency Praytell. In October, the company acquired NY City-based digital creative agency Wondersauce.

In March 2017, the company launched Project Pledge, a matching program for employee donations to charitable causes. In October, Project acquired Melbourne, Australia-based consumer engagement agency Dig+Fish.

In December 2018, Project acquired Auckland, New Zealand-based experiential agency Darkhorse.

In October 2019, the company merged its Los Angeles-based agency Pitch into its Denver-based agency Motive.

References

External links
 Official website

Companies based in Michigan
American companies established in 2010
Advertising agencies of the United States
Holding companies of the United States
2010 establishments in Michigan